Sergio Babb (born 9 August 1982) is a Dutch former professional footballer who played as a striker.

Club career
Babb played on the professional level for club FC Twente of the Dutch Eredivisie league during the 2003-2004 season and later played for German Oberliga club Eintracht Nordhorn, Dutch amateur sides HSC '21 and DETO before joining Quick '20 in summer 2016. Babb moved to Achilles '12 in July 2017, but left again one month later after suffering both an ankle and a knee injury. He immediately retired from club football.

References

External links
voetbal international profile

1982 births
Living people
Dutch people of Nigerian descent
Footballers from Amsterdam
Association football forwards
Dutch footballers
Vierde Divisie players
Eerste Klasse players
Derde Divisie players
Oberliga (football) players
FC Twente players
Eintracht Nordhorn players
HSC '21 players
DETO Twenterand players
Quick '20 players
Dutch expatriate footballers
Dutch expatriate sportspeople in Germany
Expatriate footballers in Germany